Protodiaspidina is a subtribe of armored scale insects.

Genera
Anaimalaia
Dungunia
Kyphosoma
Megacanthaspis
Pentacicola
Protodiaspis
Thoa

References

Diaspidini